WalFadjri is an independent daily newspaper published in Senegal. It is a French newspaper. It was owned by Sidy Lamine Niasse.

See also

 Lists of newspapers
 Media of Senegal

References

External links
 walkf.sn (in French), the newspaper's official website

French-language newspapers published in Africa
Newspapers published in Senegal
Publications with year of establishment missing